Xenohammus bimaculatus is a species of beetle in the family Cerambycidae. It was described by Bernhard Schwarzer in 1931. It is known from Taiwan, China and Japan.

References

Lamiini
Beetles described in 1931